Alucita huebneri is a moth of the family Alucitidae. It is found in most of Europe, except Ireland, Great Britain, the Benelux, Fennoscandia, Latvia, the Baltic region, Ukraine and Slovenia. The habitat consists of mesotrophic meadows, colline and montane hay meadows on altitudes between 200 and 400 metres.

The wingspan is about 15 mm. Adults are on wing from May to June and in September.

The larvae feed on Scabiosa, Centaurea and Knautia species. They live within the flowers and on seeds of their host plant.

References

External links

 Images representing  Alucita huebneri at Consortium for the Barcode of Life

Moths described in 1859
Alucitidae
Moths of Europe
Moths of Asia
Taxa named by Hans Daniel Johan Wallengren